Jallian Wala Bagh is a 1977 Indian Hindi-language film written, produced and directed by Balraj Tah, with a screenplay by Gulzar. It is based on the Jallianwala Bagh massacre, also known as the Amritsar massacre, where in 1919 Colonel Reginald Dyer ordered troops under his command to fire into a crowd of unarmed Indian 379

civilians, killing . It stars Vinod Khanna, Parikshat Sahni, Shabana Azmi, Sampooran Singh Gulzar, and Deepti Naval. The film is also a part-biopic of Udham Singh (played by Parikshit Sahni) who assassinated Michael O'Dwyer, the governor of Punjab at the time of the massacre, in 1940.

Cast
 Vinod Khanna
 Parikshat Sahni as Udham Singh 
 Shabana Azmi
 Sampooran Singh Gulzar as Suneel 
 Om Shivpuri
 Ram Mohan
 Deepti Naval
 Sudhir Thakkar
 Mark Freeman

Music
"Ditti Heer Likha Ke Ae He Chitthi" - Bhupinder Singh
"Suliyon Pe Chadke Choome (Part 1)" - Bhupinder Singh
"Suliyon Pe Chadke Chume (Part- 2)" - Bhupinder Singh

External links
 

1977 films
1970s Hindi-language films
Films scored by R. D. Burman
Indian films based on actual events
Hindi-language films based on actual events
Indian historical films
Films set in Amritsar
Films set in the British Raj
Films set in the Indian independence movement